Fanfares is the debut album by jazz piano trio GoGo Penguin. In 2013, this album was nominated for best jazz album at the Worldwide Awards.

Track listing
Gondwana Records – GONDCD008 & GONDLP008:

Personnel
 Chris Illingworth – piano
 Grant Russell – double bass
 Rob Turner – drums

References

2012 debut albums
GoGo Penguin albums